Neoscutopterus hornii is a species of predaceous diving beetle in the family Dytiscidae.  It is found in North America.

References

Further reading

 
 
 
 
 
 
 

Dytiscidae
Beetles described in 1873